Bolesławiec (pronounced  ,) is a historic city situated on the Bóbr River in the Lower Silesian Voivodeship, in western Poland. It is the administrative seat of Bolesławiec County, and of Gmina Bolesławiec (being an urban gmina in its own right). As of June 2021, it has a population of 38,280. Founded in the 13th century, the city is known for its long-standing pottery-making tradition and heritage Old Town.

History
The name Bolesławiec is derived from the Silesian duke Bolesław I the Tall. The castellany of Bolezlauez in Lower Silesia was first mentioned in a 1201 deed. According to tradition, its citizens took part in the Battle of Legnica during the first Mongol invasion of Poland in 1241. Bolesławiec celebrated its 750th anniversary in 2001.

Middle Ages

In the Early Middle Ages the region was inhabited by the Bobrzanie tribe, one of the Polish tribes, and it became part of the emerging Polish state under its first historic ruler Mieszko I around 990. A Slavic stronghold was erected in present-day Bolesławiec in the late 9th century. It is now an archaeological site. As a result of the 12th-century fragmentation of Poland into smaller duchies still ruled by the founding Piast dynasty, it formed part of the duchies of Silesia, Legnica and Jawor until 1392. Following the 1241 Mongol invasion, a walled town began to take shape. In 1251, mention is made of Boleslawiec's town charter. Then a part of the Silesian Duchy of Legnica under Bolesław II the Bald, the town from 1297 belonged to the Duchy of Jawor under Bolko I the Strict. In 1316, in order to better protect the townspeople from hostile incursion, new walls were constructed around the town. The city seal, still used today, was also first used in 1316.

In 1346, the town joined seven other urban centers in forming the Silesian Association of Fortified Towns. In that same year, the Duchy of Jawor with Bolesławiec was inherited by Duke Bolko II the Small of Świdnica, and upon his death in 1368, it was inherited by Emperor Charles IV, who had married Duke Bolko's niece Anna of Świdnica. After the dissolution of the Duchy of Jawor in 1392, the town was incorporated into the Kingdom of Bohemia, itself a state of the Holy Roman Empire.

The year 1422 was of particular importance, because in that year, the town was granted beer-brewing privileges. The walls surrounding Bunzlau, now more than a century old, in 1429 failed to prevent a Hussite army from sacking the town.  Further tribulations transpired in 1462 when the Bóbr river flooded the lower-lying sections of the town. From 1469 to 1490 it was under the rule of Hungary, before falling back to Bohemia, then ruled by the Jagiellonian dynasty. In 1479, the old defenses were replaced by a new double ring of walls.

Early modern period

1523 marked the start of the religious wars between Catholics and Protestants, with the majority of the town's residents converting to the new break-away faith — Bunzlau became an important center of the Protestant Reformation. Through all of it, the town kept growing: in 1525, the architect Wendel Roskopf began a rebuilding of the town hall in the new Renaissance style. 1531 saw the completion of town's first sewage and water supply system; the first apothecary opened its doors in 1558; a post station was established in 1573.  In 1596, Bunzlau found itself a stop along the new Via Regia trade route connecting Wrocław (Breslau) with Leipzig. This was a major factor in promoting the growth of trade and the distribution of products, such as the locally produced pottery.

In 1642, during the Thirty Years' War, Bunzlau experienced another hostile event, this time a pillaging by Swedish forces under General Lennart Torstenson, which reduced the castle, church, and much of the housing to ruins. In the 18th century, one of two main routes connecting Warsaw and Dresden ran through the town, and Kings Augustus II the Strong and Augustus III of Poland often traveled that route. After the First Silesian War in 1742, the town, along with most of Silesia, found itself in the expanding Kingdom of Prussia. During the 18th century, a much-esteemed Royal Orphanage was established, a church for Protestant worship erected, and the town hall underwent yet another face lift, this time in the Baroque manner.

Late modern period

From 1815 onwards, Bunzlau belonged to the Prussian Province of Silesia. The demolition of the old ring of defensive walls began around 1820, allowing for the physical expansion of the town out from its medieval center. Beginning in 1844, work commenced on a railway viaduct across the Bober River. Much admired for its engineering, the Bober (Bóbr) Viaduct stretched . In 1871 the town became part of the German Empire. In 1897, Bunzlau was selected as the site for a technical college devoted to the ceramics industry. In 1907 the town council resolved to open a museum devoted to the history of pottery making. During 1920, a concrete motorcar bridge was constructed across the Bober.

During World War II, Bolesławiec was the site of a brief battle on September 1, 1939, during the German invasion of Poland. The town, defended by two squadrons of Border Protection Corps cavalry, was attacked by Waffen-SS troops of the SS Leibstandarte Adolf Hitler. The Polish cavalrymen successfully repelled the initial attack, destroying three German armored cars in the process. The SS troops proceeded to bombard the town forcing the Polish troops to withdraw, the Germans entered Bolesławiec by late morning and carried out reprisal killings of civilians. During the occupation the Germans established two subcamps of the Gross-Rosen concentration camp in the town. The prisoners of AL Bunzlau I were mainly Jews, and the prisoners of AL Bunzlau II were mainly Poles and citizens of the Soviet Union. On February 11, 1945, prisoners able to walk were evacuated by the Germans in a death march to the Mittelbau-Dora concentration camp, while sick prisoners from both subcamps were left in AL Bunzlau I and eventually liberated by the Soviet troops. The war left 60% of the town in ruins, when it was captured by the Red Army on 12 February 1945. After Germany's defeat in the war, Bolesławiec became again part of Poland. Despite considerable damage, the Old Town with its central marketplace and medieval town hall have been preserved.

Between 1945 and 1948, an Autonomous Jewish District in Lower Silesia, centered on Bolesławiec, was established for the incoming Holocaust survivors. It was not favoured by the Communist authorities, and most of its supporters or advocates subsequently moved to Israel when the district was disbanded. A Polish school and library was founded in 1945. During the 1960s, the ceramic workshops were reopened and then expanded to be joined by a chemical plant, a factory for the production of vials and ampules, and a mining works. The market square was rebuilt in keeping with its historic past, and a new museum dedicated to the town's rich ceramic heritage was opened.  Bolesławiec emerged as a significant regional cultural center with an international reputation for hosting a variety of imaginative festivals and events.

Bolesławiec was previously in Jelenia Góra Voivodeship (1975–1998).

Transport
The Polish National road 94, and the Voivodeship roads 297, 350, 363 run through Bolesławiec, and the east–west A4 motorway, which is part of the European route E40, runs nearby, north of the town.

Pottery

The town of Bolesławiec and its satellite communes Nowogrodziec, Ołdrzychów, and Bolesławice have a long ceramic history. The pottery is also identified with the German name for the town: Bunzlau.  Bunzlauer ware (Ceramika bolesławiecka) evolved from a folk tradition into a distinct ceramic category distinguishable by form, fabric, glaze, and decoration. The term "Bunzlauer ware" may also be used to describe stylistically-related pottery produced in the neighboring districts of Lusatia and Saxony. Taken as a whole, Bunzlauer ware ranks among the most important folk pottery traditions in Europe.

The area around Bolesławiec is rich in clays suited to the potter's wheel. Typically, utilitarian Bunzlauer pottery was turned on a kick wheel, dried leather-hard, dipped in a slip glaze and then burnt in a rectangular, cross-draft kiln. In order to make their pottery watertight, Bunzlauer potters applied a coating of liquid clay, or slip. When fired, the slip glaze varied from a chocolate to dark brown. Since the fabric of Bunzlauer ware retains some porosity, the pottery conveniently has been suited for cooking over an open fire or for baking in an oven, as well as for storage.

Origins

There is archaeological evidence for pottery being turned in the region as early as the 7th century. Documentary evidence demonstrates potting activity in Bolesławiec itself by the 14th century. High-fired earthenware covered in brown and yellow lead glazes was being produced in Bolesławiec from the late 15th century. By 1473, five separate potteries were at work in the city, and in 1511 they came together to form a guild in order to enforce their monopoly of pottery making.

Early Bunzlauer pottery is exceedingly rare today. The majority of a potshop's production would have been intended for farm and kitchen use: kraut containers, cheese sieves, pickling and preserve jars, baking forms, food molds, storage vessels, and so forth. Most of these stock-in-trade storage or cooking items have either disappeared or go unrecognized and undated today.

What has survived is the "fancy ware" intended for display on the table or in the parlor and used with care. In addition to their utilitarian items, the Bunzlauer potteries of Silesia turned out elegant tankards, pitchers and containers, all bathed in the brown slip "glaze" that characterized this early phase of the Bunzlauer style. The tankards and pitchers often received pewter mountings. The first examples of a distinctive Bunzlauer style are ball-shaped jugs and screw-lidded jars, often decorated with applied cartouches filled with intricate floral design. At first the entire pot, including the decorations, was covered in the same brown slip.  Later examples used a yellowish lead glaze for the applied decorations which then stood out against the darker surface of the vessel (Adler, 95).  A famous example of Bunzlauer pottery from this period is the hexagonal travel bottle with applied pewter mounts, originally belonging to Pastor Merge and dating to 1640–45.

A type of round-bodied jug with spiraling ribs called a "melon jug" attained popularity in the last quarter of the 17th century and continued to be produced on into the next century. Some examples gave up the application of slip in favor of colored lead glazes. After leaving the potshop, many of these melon jugs received pewter lids made by a tinsmith before being shipped off by wagon or on the back of peddlers to customers in Prussia, Bohemia, and Poland, even as far away as Russia.

Once Silesia had come under the control of the Kingdom of Prussia in 1742, the Prussian government took an active interest in promoting the pottery industry and intervened in favor of increased production. It did not take long before there was an influx of potters from Franconia, Saxony, Lusatia, and Bavaria eager to work the fine Bunzlauer clays. The old restrictive guild system was ignored as new potteries came into existence. Finally, in 1762, the guild system was abolished.

Among the German potters who moved to the town was the master potter Johann Gottlieb Joppe, who arrived in Bunzlau in 1751. Two years later, he presented the town with the "Great Pot."

At about the same time that the wave of German potters arrived, so did a new type of pot. It was designed for a very specific purpose: to contain a newly fashionable beverage. Coffee had been introduced as the drink of choice among the European elite. Since the Bunzlauer clays tolerated rapid changes in temperature they were well-suited in the making of coffee pots. These coffee pots were often accompanied sugar bowls, jam jars and milk pitchers to complete the coffee service, all covered in a coffee-colored slip.

Initially, the Bunzlauer coffee pots were elongated and egg-shaped, their small size emphasizing the preciousness of the contents (Adler, 96). Many of these new forms were covered with delicate sprig-molded reliefs whose white glazing set them off against the chocolate-brown surface of the pot. Coats-of-arms, flowers, angels, stags, and neo-classical figure were common decorative additions to these special vessels. Their appearance is reminiscent of the well-known Jasperware contemporaneously being produced in England by Josiah Wedgwood.

Industrialisation

Under the auspices of the Prussian kings, who encouraged the growth of the Silesian ceramic industry, Bunzlauer ware achieved a widespread recognition and was shipped throughout the states of Germany. Bunzlauer ware's popularity increased even more after 1828, when the potter Johann Gottlieb Altmann produced a feldspar substitute for the dangerous lead glaze that previously had been used on the interior of the vessels. Altmann also turned his attention to the production of a line of Biedermeier inspired porcelain vessels which were cast rather than wheel turned.

So valued had the pottery of the Bunzlauer region become that it was shipped not only throughout the German states but exported into Russia and Austria. The 19th-century heyday for Bunzlauer ceramics came in the 1870s, when close to 20 different family-run pottery shops were in operation in Bunzlau itself, and some 35 in the neighboring town of Naumburg am Queis (Nowogrodziec).  A large number of potters were apprenticed during this period and many of them succeeded in opening their own shops. This resulted in a near doubling of the number of pottery-producing firms in Bunzlau by the mid-1890s.

By the end of the 19th century, however, changes in lifestyle, increasing urbanization, and growing competition from new products such as enameled metalware and glass began to constrict sales. Many of the firms were forced to close. Faced with this threat, the remaining Bunzlauer potters, while continuing to meet an agrarian  demand for traditional undecorated brown slip vessels, introduced new lines of smaller wares intended for display in the parlors and dining rooms of middle-class consumers. They began to experiment with colored glazes and application (spongeware) techniques, all aimed at catching the eye of an increasingly urban and urbane public. In their survival effort, the local artisans were aided by professors at the government-sponsored Keramische Fachschule (Ceramic Technical Training School), which had been established in Bunzlau in 1898 under the leadership of the Berlin ceramicist Dr. Wilhelm Pukall (1860–1936).

The simple blue-on-white spongeware and swirlware productions of the 1880s and 1890s with their clear feldspathic glazes were successful initially, but something still more colorful and forceful was needed if modern customers were to be attracted. This demand was met when, at the turn of the century, Bunzlauer pottery underwent a colorful transformation and a new chapter in its history was opened.

During the first decades of the 20th century, pot shops throughout Silesia and neighboring Lusatia began to decorate their wares with imaginative organic motifs derived from the contemporary Jugendstil aesthetic and applied by brush or, more often, with the aid of cut sponges. Floral designs were common embellishments, but the most popular was the Pfauenauge (peacock's eye) design inspired by the Jugendstil decorators' fascination with the peacock's rich plumage. The Pfauenauge motif became the unofficial, but universally recognized, signature trademark for this category of German spongeware.

By the beginning of the second decade of the new century, many of the potteries throughout the region had evolved into sophisticated  ceramic studios, generally continuing to turn out the old utilitarian brown-slip production but giving ever-increasing attention to their new line of colorful ware.  Although new designs, many based upon the orientalizing forms popular at the time, were introduced, traditional shapes for coffee pots, bowls, and pitchers were retained but with their surfaces now brightened with a wide variety of popular Jugendstil patterns, particularly, that of the Pfauenauge.

Even in the studio wares, the blend of folk art and high art is curious and charming, with many of the new and decorative elements taking on a decidedly "country" appearance. This is true for the production of the art potter, Friedrich Festersen (1880–1915), born in northern Schleswig, who opened his Kunsttöpferei Friedrich Festersen in Berlin in 1909 at about the same time that the peacock's eye motif was beginning to embellish the ceramics of Bunzlau. Festersen's connection with the Bunzlauer potteries is uncertain but the peacock's eye motif is to be found throughout the production of his studio.  There is no evidence that Festersen turned himself and the potters he employed may have come from Bunzlau, bringing the fashionable new designs with them. Although Festersen was a casualty of the First World War, his art pottery survived until 1922 under the leadership of his widow Sonja.

Increasingly, individual potters and workshops began to mark their wares. Among the prominent names were those of Robert Burdack (who introduced a unique technique of ceramic intarsia inlay), Julius Paul, Hugo Reinhold, and Edwin Werner from Bunzlau and from the surrounding towns of Tillendorf (Bolesławice), Ullersdorf (Ołdrzychów), and Naumburg am Queis came Karl Werner, Gerhard Seiler, Hugo Reinwald, Max Lachmann, Bruno Vogt, and Hermann Kuehn.

So popular did the new Bunzlauer style become that several of the firms, using the technical advice offered by the Bunzlau Keramische Fachschule, transformed their pot shops into large-scale, slip-casting ceramic factories. Leading the way in this manufacturing conversion was the pottery company of Julius Paul & Sohn which was founded in 1893 and continued in operation until 1945. This company was rivaled in quality and innovative design by the firms of Hugo Reinhold, and Edwin Werner. While most of the potteries in Bunzlau and in the surrounding communities continued to utilize the forms by now traditional to Bunzlauer ware, these three "high style" firms experimented with Jugendstil aesthetics and such decorative additions as gold gilding.

All of these commercializing developments encouraged a flourishing export trade which brought shipments of Bunzluer pottery not only to all parts of Europe but into the United States as well, where it competed with similar but recognizably distinct wares produced in neighboring Saxony and Lusatia by such potters as Paul Schreier of Bischofswerda. In the United States, Bunzlauer ware was often marketed under the labels of "Blue Mountain Pottery" or "Erphila," the acronym of the Philadelphia retailer Eberling & Reuss.

The economic collapse of Germany following World War I was hard on the potters of Bunzlau.  They responded by banding together in order to minimize total cost and to market their wares more effectively.  The Vereinigte Topfwarenfabrikanten Bunzlau (Bunzlau Pottery Manufacturers Association) was formed in 1921 and lasted until 1929. Shortly before World War II, six of the potteries agreed to cooperate under the name Aktion Bunzlauer Braunzeug (Bunzlauer Brown Ware Action Group) assuming a new mission to revive the historical traditions of the region's pottery.  Much of the ware produced was based upon the elegant examples of the early  19th century.

During the 1920s, the Bunzlauer potters also began to borrow design elements from the postwar Art Deco style. In Art Deco, the naturalistic curves of Jugendstil gave way to geometric patterns and the streamlined aerodynamics appropriate to the machine age and the concept of mass production. The Art Deco style, as it developed in Germany, was significantly influenced by Cubism and its offshoot Suprematism. The Suprematist style of pure, geometric abstraction had developed in Russia and was introduced into the famous Bauhaus Design School in Dessau in the 1920s. It was probably from the Bauhaus that this modernist aesthetic was transmitted initially to the 
Ceramic Technical Training in Bunzlau and then into the design repertoire of those decorating Bunzlauer pottery in the years between the two world wars.  The geometric patterns of these new designs were well suited to application utilizing the newly invented airbrush canister and stencil patterns. The Bunzlauer potteries, however, continued to use the ever-popular peacock's eye motif on their spongeware production; they simply added new design lines offering an alternative to a new generation of buyer.

Post-war era

The defeat of Germany in World War II and the transfer of the bulk of Lower Silesia to Poland, with the subsequent expulsion of the German population, threatened to end the Bunzlauer ceramic tradition, but it managed to survive in the shops established by displaced potters in the ceramic centers of West Germany, where Bunzlauer style pottery continued to be produced, long celebrated for their native earthenwares or salt-glazed and cobalt-decorated stonewares. Gerhard Seiler from Naumburg am Queis relocated to Leutershausen in Bavaria. Paul Vogt, also from Naumburg settled in Pang near Rosenheim. Max and Wilhelm Werner from Tillendorf initially moved to Höhr-Grenzhausen in the Westerwald range before setting up a shop in nearby Hilgert in 1960. Höhr-Grenzhausen also attracted Georg and Steffi Peltner as well as the firm of Alois Boehm. Georg Greulich opened his pottery in Fredelsloh. The Buchwald brothers relocated to Bayreuth, while Hans Wesenberg founded a studio in Ludwigsburg. Several of these master potters from the Bunzlau district took on fellow Silesian apprentices who went on to open shops of their own in western Germany. Thus, hundreds of miles to the west of Silesia, the Bunzlauer tradition remained alive and well.

The Bunzlauer style also has survived in the continuously functioning pot shops of former East Germany in the potting communities of Neukirch/Lausitz, Bischofswerda, Pulsnitz, and Königsbrück. The Upper Lusatian town of Königsbrück is home to the Frommhold Pottery, founded in 1851, the last survivor of 21 potteries once active in the community. The town of Neukirch has contained three active potteries to continue the tradition, that of the Kannegiesser family begun in 1824, that of Karl Louis Lehmann established in 1834, and the Heinke Pottery producing ware since 1866. Pulsnitz is the home of the Juergel Pottery, thought to have been responsible for first introducing the sponging technique and the peacock-eye motif into Lusatia.

Meanwhile, back in Bolesławiec, a new and Polish chapter in the pottery's history was opening, after the city had been severely damaged in the war and its German population expelled. The Polish population that moved in found the surviving ceramic manufacturies stripped of machinery and equipment. Nevertheless, despite the lack of technical expertise in ceramic production in post-war Poland, one of the old factories was back in operation as early as 1946. But it was not until two years later that the first simple pots were being turned out.

Ceramic specialist Professor Tadeusz Szafran was dispatched to oversee the reconstruction of the potteries which also received guidance from the Wrocław Academy of Fine Arts.  Szafran supervised the reopening of one of the most significant of the old factories, that of Hugo Reinhold and in 1950 the former firm of Julius Paul reopened under the name Center of Folk and Artistic Industry 'Cepelia'.  In 1951, Izabela Zdrzalka became the artistic director of Cepelia, holding that position until 1957. During her tenure, the pottery produced ware decorated with traditional spongeware designs but also experimented with more contemporary forms and decorations, but always with the intent of preserving an aesthetic memory of the old Bunzlauer folk-pottery tradition, known now as "bunzloki". By the 1960s production was once again flourishing. In 1964, Bronislaw Wolanin joined the Cepelia firm as its artistic director. It was Wolanin who largely was responsible for establishing the designs typifying today's production; this is based upon the continued use of the popular peacock's eye motif. The Cepelia operation moved into greatly enlarged and modernized quarters in 1989 in keeping with increasing demand throughout Europe, the United States and Australia.

The largest producer of Bolesławiec Polish pottery is Bolesławiec Artistic Ceramic. Most of its production is destined for export. It can be recognized by its trademark stamp based upon the three-tower Bolesławiec coat-of-arms below the letter "B". This mark was used until 1996, when it was replaced by the letter "B" enclosed within the outline of a typical Bunzlauer coffee pot set above the castle. Bolesławiec pottery shipped to the United States will have "Hand Made in Poland" stamped on the base of each piece of crockery.

With the collapse of Communism, the two large state-owned ceramic manufacturies on the outskirts of Bolesławiec were privatized and several smaller private potteries were opened. In these smaller workshops, the potters turn each piece on the wheel but the larger manufacturies mold-cast their ceramics which are then hand finished, fired, hand decorated using either brush or sponge stamp, glazed and refired. The shapes and patterns found in the ceramic showrooms of Bolesławiec today and which are offered for sale, worldwide, at a number of outlet stores and internet sites, are staggering in variety: coffee pots, tea pots, cups, mugs, pitchers, platters, breakfast and dinner services, sets of bowls, candle holders, butter dishes cast in the shape of full-skirted peasant women, Christmas tree ornaments, all painted or sponge decorated in cheerful and colorful, folkloric patterns.

The Bolesławiec pottery that is most recognizable today is the white or cream colored ceramic with dark blue, green, brown, and sometimes red or purple motifs. Some of the designs used in this modern Polish pottery rendition of the older Bunzlauer ware harkens back to the German decorative motifs of the pre-war period but the new ceramic artisans of Bolesławiec have not hesitated to invent their own decorations, many of which are designed to have an especial appeal to the pottery's growing international clientele. The most common designs in today's production include sponge-stamped dots, abstract florals, speckles, windmills, and, of course, the famous "peacock's eye."

A growing appreciation for this ceramic category has been stimulated by a number of public exhibitions.  The initial one, in which more than900 pieces were on display, was entitled "Bunzlauer Geschirr: Gebrauchsware zwischen Handwerk und Industrie" was held at three venues in Germany in 1986–88: the Museum fuer Deutsche Volkskunde in Berlin, the Hetjens-Museum in Düsseldorf and the Altonaer Museum in Hamburg.  The catalogue to this exhibition has become the standard reference work for those interested in Bunzlauer pottery.  Additional presentations of Bunzlauer pottery in Germany have included "Guter Ton aus Bunzlau" on view in 2004–05 at the Germanisches Nationalmuseum in Nuremberg featuring examples from that institution's extensive collection; "Bunzlauer Keramik: Schlesisches Kunsthandwerk"  at the Keramik-Museum Berlin in 2008; "Bunzlauer Tippel nach 1945" at the Bunzlauer Heimatstube in Siegburg in 2009; and "Bunzlauer Keramik – Gestern und Heute" at the Haus des Deutschen Ostens in Munich in 2011   
-12. Polish museums also have contributed to the increasing public awareness of Bunzlauer pottery. In 1995, the Ceramics Museum in Boleslaweic collaborated with the Muzeum Narodowe, Wrocław (National Museum, Wrocław) in presenting "Artystyczna Kamionka Bolesławiecka," utilizing the holdings of both museums.  In 2008, Bolesławiec's Ceramic Museum organized a show centered around one of the most prominent of the town's pre-war potteries, that of Hugo Reinhold. "Vom Kunsthandwerk zur Kunst – Bunzlauer Keramik aus dem Haus Reinhold" was also exhibited in Germany at the Schlesisches Museum in Görlitz. Another of Bunzlau's accomplished ceramic producers was celebrated in Austria when "Art Deco Keramik Bunzlau: die Feinsteinzeugfabrik Julius Paul & Sohn 1893–1945" was presented at the Oesterreiches Postsparkasse in Vienna. In addition to these European exhibitions, there have been three showings of Bunzlauer ceramics in the United States.  The first took place at the McKissick Museum of the University of South Carolina in Columbia, South Carolina in 1998 as part of an exhibit called "Two Traditions in Transition: Folk Potters of Eastern Germany and the American South."  This was followed by "Bunzlauer Style: German Pottery from Jugendstil to Art Deco," presented in 2002 by the Georgia Museum of Art in Athens, Georgia. Bunzlauer Pottery also was featured in an exhibit at the Columbia Museum of Art in Columbia, South Carolina in 2005–06.

Older, pre-war examples of Bunzlauer pottery are avidly sought by collectors today.  Private collections abound, especially in Germany but also abroad, including the United States where some individuals have amassed collections of more than 100 pieces of the pre-1945 pottery, most of which had been imported during the period between the two world wars. Extensive public collections of Bunzlauer ceramics are to be found in Poland at the Muzeum Ceramiki in Bolesławiec (with over 2000 pieces) and the National Museum in Wrocław; in Germany at the Schlesisches Museum in Görlitz, the permanent exhibition Keramik des Bunzlauer Töpfergebietes at Antik Leonhardt, Görlitz, at the Germanisches Nationalmuseum in Nuremberg, at the Keramik-Museum and at the Museum Europäischer Kulturen in Berlin, at the Haus der Begegnung of the Bundesheimatgruppe Bunzlau in Siegburg, at the Heimatmuseums in Neukirch/Lausitz and Pulsnitz, at the Museum für Sächsische Volkskunst in Dresden, and at the Sorbian Museum in Bautzen; and in the United States at the Columbia Museum of Art in Columbia, South Carolina which houses a collection of 110 pieces.

Notable people
 
Martin Opitz (1597–1639), German baroque poet, Polish royal secretary and historiographer of King Władysław IV Vasa
Carl Ferdinand Appun (1820–1872), German naturalist
Reinhold Röhricht (1842–1905), German historian
Fritz Schulz (1879–1957), German jurist and writer
Hermann Schey (1895–1981), bass-baritone
Dieter Hildebrandt (1927–2013), German cabaret artist
Frederick Kawerau (1817–), Australian architect
Łukasz Kubot (born 1982), Polish tennis player
Monika Sozanska (born 1983), Polish–German épée fencer

Field Marshal Prince Mikhail Kutuzov died at Bunzlau on 28 April 1813 during the War of the Sixth Coalition, in 1819 King Frederick William III of Prussia had a cast iron memorial erected, designed by Karl Friedrich Schinkel.

Twin towns – sister cities

Bolesławiec is twinned with:

 Acuto, Italy
 Česká Lípa, Czech Republic
 Mariagerfjord, Denmark
 Molde, Norway
 Nogent-sur-Marne, France
 Pirna, Germany
 Prnjavor, Bosnia and Herzegovina
 Siegburg, Germany
 Vallecorsa, Italy
 Zbarazh, Ukraine

References

Adler, Beatrix. Early Stoneware Steins from the Les Paul Collection. Petersburg: Imhof, 2007.
Banas, Pawel and Jolania Sozanska, et al. Ceramika boleslawiecka z wytworni Reinolda = Bunzlauer Keramik aus dem Hause Reinhold. (exh. cat) Boleslawiec-Jelenia Gora: Moniatowicz, 2008.
Bober, Anna et al. Sladami Boleslawieckiej Kamionki. Boleslawiec: Muzeum Ceramiki, 2003.
Bober, Anna and Teresa Wolanin. Muzeum Ceramiki w Boleslawcu. Przcwodnik = Fuehrer durch das Bunzlauer Keramikmuseum. Boleslawiec-Jelenia Gora: Moniatowicz, 2001.
Boleslawiec." Bydgoszcz, PL: Wydawnictwo Telst, 2001.
Endres, Werner et al. Beitraege zur Bunzlauer Keramik (Nearchos 5). Innsbruck: Universitaet Innsbruck, 1997.
Gorecki, Bogdan. Artistic Ceramics Boleslawiec, 1950–2000. Boleslawiec, 2000.
Lippert, Inge, Werner Endres. Bunzlauer Keramik: Die Feinsteinzeugfabrik Julius Paul & Sohn in Bunzlau (1893–1945). Stuttgart: Arnoldische Verlag, 2001.
Mack, Charles R. & Ilona S. "Bunzlauer Geschirr: A German Pottery Tradition" in Southeastern College Art Conference Review, 13, 2 (1997), 121–131.
Mack, Charles R. & Ilona S. "The Bunzlau Pottery of Germany and Silesia." The Magazine Antiques 152 (July 1997),88–95.
Mack, Charles R. Bunzlauer Style: German Pottery from Jugenddtil to Art Deco.(exh. cat.) Athens, GA: Georgia Museum of Art, 2002.
Mueller, Heidi. Bunzlauer Geschirr: Gebrauchsware zwischen Handwerk und Industrie. Berlin: Reimer Publishing for the Museum fuer Volkskunde, 1986.
Reinheckel, Guenter. Oberlausitzer Töpferware. Husum, 2007.
Ristow, Imke. "Die Staatliche Keramische Fachschule Bunzlau und die Bunzlauer Betriebe Avantgarded und Töpfertradition," in Joanna Flawia Figiel, et al., Revolution der Muster: Spritzdekor-Keramik um 1930.Ostfildern: Hatje Cantz Publishing for the Badisches Landesmuseum Karlsruhe, 2006, pp. 135–45.
Schoene Sally. Brenn/Punkte: Keramische Fachschulen seit 1875, Landshut/Hoehr/Bunzlau. Düsseldorf: Hetjens-Museum, 2001.
Spaeth, Kristine. Töpferei in Schlesien:  Bunzlau und Umgebung. Munich: Delp, 1981.
Spindler, Konrad. Bunzlauer Keramik im Germanischen National Museum. Nuernberg, 2004.
Starzewska, Maria & Teresa Wolanin Artystyczna Kamionla Boleslawiecka. Wroclaw: Katalogi Zbiorow Muzeum Narodowego we Wroclawiu, 1995.
Steinitz, Kurt. "Die Töpferei des Kreises Bunzlau" in Schriften des Vereins fuer Socialpolitik 12.Leipzig, 1895, 167–229.
Theis, Heinz-Joachim, Kunsttöpferei Friedrch Festersen (Berlin 1909–1922).Berlin: Keramik-Museum Berlin, 2009.
Weinhold, Rudolf. Töpferwerk in der Oberlausitz. Berlin: Akademie Verlag, 1958
Wernicke, Ewald. Chronik der Stadt Bunzlau von den Aeltesten Zeiten bis zur Gegenwart. Bunzlau: 1884.
Zak, Katarzna. Boleslawiec : Miasto Ceramiki.'' Boleslawiec: Moniatowicz Foto Studio,2004

External links

Official Site of Bolesławiec
Local news service and newspaper (in Polish)
Local companies and organizations
Jewish Community in Bolesławiec on Virtual Shtetl
Local news service and newspaper (in Polish)
Bolesławiec.org/Istotne Informacje – Local News Service (in Polish)
PKP Bolesławiec – railway station
Bunzlau (Bunzel(au)) on map of Germany in 1600

Cities and towns in Lower Silesian Voivodeship
Bolesławiec County
Cities in Silesia
Archaeological sites in Poland